Padar, Azerbaijan may refer to:
Padar, Agsu, Azerbaijan
Padar, Davachi, Azerbaijan
Padar, Hajigabul, Azerbaijan
Padar, Khachmaz, Azerbaijan
Padar, Oghuz, Azerbaijan
Padar, Qubadli, Azerbaijan
Padar, Shamakhi, Azerbaijan
Padarqışlaq, Azerbaijan